This is a list of games that were cancelled from release on Commodore's line of computers and consoles ranging from the VIC-20 to the CD32. Some of those games were never released on any platform to begin with, while others had at least one release but were never ported or remade for the platform they were planned for.

VIC-20

Commodore C64

Amiga

Amiga CD32

References

Commodore